Actinopus rojasi is a species of mygalomorph spiders in the family Actinopodidae. It is found Venezuela.

References

rojasi
Spiders described in 1889